Üçnoktabir ("Three Point One"), founded as Spitney Beers, was a Turkish rock band formed in 2002. The band's members were Melis Danişmend (vocal), Barış Ertunç (guitar), Cenk Turanlı (bass) and Mehmet Demirdelen (drums).

Band History 
The band began by playing covers at Mojo Bar in Beyoğlu. They performed as an opening act for Pink in 2004. They completed a demo in 2005 and started working on their first album. They provided the song Dediler Ki (They said) for Serdar Akar's film Barda (At the Bar). A little while later, they released their album Sabaha Karşı (Against the Dawn) containing 9 songs. including hits Bahçe (The Garden), Hırsız (Thief), Ölmeden Ünlü Olsam (If I become famous before I die) and Değişmem (I will not change). The band was dissolved in April 2009. Vokalist Melis Danişmend is now a solo artist

Discography 
Dediler Ki (Barda soundtrack)
Sabaha Karşı

References

External links

Turkish rock music groups
Musical groups from Istanbul